Avex Inc. ( kabushiki gaisha  , commonly known as Avex and stylized as avex) is a Japanese entertainment conglomerate led by founder Max Matsuura and headquartered in Tokyo, Japan. Founded in 1988, the company manages J-pop talents like Ayumi Hamasaki and internet sensation PikoTaro. It has also shifted into other business domains like anime, video games and live music events, partnering with Ultra Music Festival and hosting the annual A-nation. The company is a member of the Mitsubishi UFJ Financial Group (MUFG) keiretsu.

Name
Avex is an acronym of the English words Audio Visual Expert. Since its foundation, its corporate name was Avex D.D., Incorporated, and ten years later it was changed to Avex, Incorporated.

The current name, Avex Group Holdings, Incorporated, was adopted in 2004 as part of reconstruction process after Tom Yoda's resignation. Avex Group Holdings, Incorporated was used for the main subsidiaries, while the old name (Avex, Incorporated) was for entertainment components of the Group.

In 2005, Avex, Incorporated became Avex Entertainment, Incorporated, and stayed on as part of the Group.

History

1988–1999: The early years
They began as a CD wholesaler based in Machida, Tokyo. In September 1990, they opened a recording studio and created Avex Trax as a music label. In the same year, they created "Musique Folio Inc.", a music publishing company, which became "Prime Direction Inc."

In 1993, they transferred to Aoyama, Tokyo and created a U.S. branch, called "AV Experience America Inc." The year also marked the first of Avex's yearly events. It was held in Tokyo Dome under the name "avex rave '93" and attracted 50,000 attendees. This led to the creation of the Cutting Edge label.

In 1994, they formed two UK subsidiaries, "Rhythm Republic Limited" and "Avex U.K. Limited". Later that year, they opened a disco, claimed on their website to be "the world's largest scale disco", named Velfarre.

In 1997, they opened a series of concert halls called "Zepp" with Sony Music Entertainment Japan. In early 1999, they signed an agreement with Walt Disney Records and Hollywood Records to handle the companies' Japanese CD releases. Later that year "Avex Mode", an animation company, was established. In December, the company was listed on the 1st section of the Tokyo Stock Exchange under the ticker symbol 7860.

2000–2009: Times of unity and divisiveness
In 2001, Avex opened the "avex artists academy" music school.

In 2002, they released the "CCCD", a type of copy-protected CD, and opened their building in Aoyama, paid for by Sumitomo Life and worth 205 billion yen.

In 2003, they opened a classical music business (named Avex Classics).

In January 2004, they began selling Japanese music CDs in South Korea. In December of that same year, President Max Matsuura "spotted" former idol Ami Suzuki performing live at the annual festival of their school, Nihon University. He subsequently signed her to the Avex label.

In 2005, Avex acquired distribution rights for Aozora Records' catalogue including all future Hitomi Yaida releases.

In early 2008, Avex partnered with Victor JVC to officially create the label D-topia Entertainment as a business partnership between the labels and its founder, Terukado Onishi, with the sales promotion handled by Victor while the area promotion handled by Avex. As part of the Avex Group's 20th anniversary celebration, a big project occurred with avex trax's "produced by avex trax" artists; the band Girl Next Door, formed and debuted in September 2008.

Avex Group launched its own IPTV service, BeeTV, May 2009 in partnership with NTT DoCoMo.

2004: Internal feud: Max Matsuura v. Tom Yoda
In August 2004, a feud between Max Matsuura and co-founder Tom Yoda affected the group. It started because of Yoda's ambition to expand Avex into other entertainment-related ventures, especially producing movies. In addition, he accused Ryuhei Chiba, the company's executive director and president of Avex Inc. (now Avex Planning and Development), of pursuing personal profit from a few big artists.

July 30: In a board meeting, Yoda introduced a resolution calling on Chiba to resign because of an alleged conflict of interest. A source says the disagreement arose because Chiba had signed an artist managed by a member of his family. The board backed Yoda's resolution in a 6-1 vote. However, Matsuura — described by insiders as a close ally of Chiba — introduced a second resolution demanding that Yoda step down due to "a difference of opinion in management principles". Matsuura's motion was defeated 5-2. He and Chiba resigned the next day.
 
August 2: Matsuura and Chiba announced their resignations in a meeting with employees of Avex. Chiba denied any fault, while Matsuura complained that Avex had lost its love of music and said he wanted to start over. They had the support of many staff who also said they would quit. More significantly, the label's top star, Ayumi Hamasaki, said she would leave. As a result, Avex's stocks in the TSE fell by 16 percent that day.

August 3: Due to pressure by employees and artists and to save the company from bankruptcy, Yoda resigned and was replaced by Toshio Kobayashi.

2010–present
AGHD is listed at the Frankfurt Stock Exchange and Börse München of Germany under the ticker symbol AX8.

More K-pop artists from other agencies continued to sign with Avex such as SM Entertainment's TVXQ (2006), YG Entertainment's 2NE1 (2010), S-plus Entertainment's SS501 member Kim Hyung Jun (2011), Pledis Entertainment's After School (2011), NH Media's U-KISS (2011) and Yejeon Media's Shu-I (2011).

On July 21, 2011, it was announced that Avex had paired with Korean management label YG Entertainment to form YGEX.

In 2012, the group began offering limited releases for sale, DRM-free for the first time within Japan on Amazon MP3. Max Matsuura and Toshio Kobayashi, the company's top two individual shareholders, launched their own investment companies to anchor their shares in 2012.

As a show of modernization, Avex Group moved to Izumi Garden Tower in Roppongi in October 2014. The company was designated to the 36th floor – the former address of DWANGO.

On February 15, 2017, Avex Group discontinued all foreign exports of Blu-rays, DVDs, and CDs published under their Avex Pictures label. The company provided no official statement on the decision.

Operations

Subsidiaries
In April 2010, the Avex Group corporation was re-structured to establish Avex Music Publishing Inc. as a consolidated subsidiary, in a corporate spin-off of music publishing division of Avex Group Holdings Inc. Thus the Avex Group became a pure holding company, with a corporate structure as follows:

Japan
 
 
 
  (Formerly Musique Folio Inc. and Prime Direction Inc.)

Other
 Avex International Holding Corporation
 Avex Asia Pte. Ltd.
 Avex Taiwan Inc. – Est. July 1998
 Avex USA Inc.

Affiliates
 Memory-Tech Corporation
 RecoChoku Co., Ltd.
 AWA

Music labels

 Avex Casa (house music and electronica)
 Avex Classics (classical music)
 Avex Globe (globe's label)
 Avex Ideak
 Avex International (international releases)
 Avex IO
 Avex Trance (trance music)
 Avex Trax (first record label of the group (1990))
 Avex Tune (dance music)
 Xgalx
B-ME (joint venture with BMSG)
 Binyl Records (rock music)
 Dive in! Disc
 Gokukara Records (joint venture with Marty Friedman)
 PopTop
 Blowgrow
 Commmons (joint venture with Ryuichi Sakamoto)
 Cross-A
 Cutting Edge (second record label of the Group (1993.12))
 Dimension Point (Namie Amuro's label)
 Disc du Soleil
 Dois Irmaos (Lisa Ono)
 Espionage Records (joint venture with Verbal)
 Five-D Plus
 Foxtrot (joint venture with Rams Incorporated)
 FRAME (joint venture with Level-5; founded by the latter with Up-Front Works)
 Hach Entertainment (joint venture with NTT SmartConnect)
 Hi-BPM Studio
 HPQ (Visual kei)
 Idol Street (for idol performers, launched October 2, 2010, by Tatsuo Higuchi)
 Island Records
 J-Friends Project
 J-More
 Justa Music
 Locomusic (Love-chan's label)
 Love Life Records (Hitomi's label)
 Mad Pray Records (Anna Tsuchiya's label)
 Maximum 10
 MENT RECORDING (joint venture with Johnny & Associates)
 Motorod Records
 nakedrecords
 Oorong Records (joint venture with Oorong-sha Group)
 Rhythm Republic
 Rhythm Zone (third record label of the Group (1999))
 Fluctus
 Riddim Zone
 Starz by Rhythm Zone
 Rising Records
 Sonic Groove
 Superb Trax
 Tachytelic Records (joint venture with Taku Takahashi)
 Tank Top Records
 Tearbridge Production
 The Six Dragons
 True Song Music (Dai Nagao's label)
 Velfarre Records
 YGEX (joint label with YG Entertainment)

Entertainment ventures
 Movies
 Domestic
 Avex Pictures
 DIVE II Entertainment
 Foreign
 Elephant Pictures
 PiX Inc.
 Artist Management
 Avex Management
 Platinum Productions
 Digital
 Avex Broadcasting and Communications (joint venture with NTT docomo)
 mu-mo.net (Japanese) (own music store of the Group)
 Theater Company
 $4.50 Theater Company

Labels distributed

 A stAtion (Ayaka's own record label), since 2012.
 AKS Co., Ltd. (AKB48's agency), since 2006. (Avex currently handles AKS' DVD releases.)
 Aozora Records, since 2005.
 GMT Records, since 2005.
 Armada Music
 , since 2003.
 CAM Entertainment, since 2008.
 D-topia Entertainment, since 2008. (co-distributed with Victor Entertainment and Universal Music Japan)
 Danger Crue Records, from 2006 to 2012. (now handled by Sony Music Japan)
 Disney Music Group, from 1999 to present (co-handled with Universal Music Group from 2018 for albums when live converts are handled by Avex).
 Fluxus Entertainment
 Free-Will
 ISM Label (kannivalism's label), since 2006.
 HATS Unlimited (Taro Hakase's label)
 AG Label
 Higashiyakena Soundbuilder (HY's label), since 2000.
 I Scream Records, since 2010. (Japan only)
 Johnny & Associates (Taiwan and Hong Kong only)
 J Storm
 Johnny's Entertainment 
 Kontor Records
 P-Vine Records (co-distributed with Victor Entertainment and BMG Japan/Sony Music Japan)
 Almond Eyes
 Kai-san Factory
 SM Entertainment, since 2000.
 S2S Pte. Ltd. (Japan only)
 Toy's Factory (Taiwan only, since 2012)
 Vamprose, since 2008. (Vamps and Monoral's label)
 Vandit
 Vine Entertainment
 Yamaha Music Communications Inc., since 2006.
 contemode

Promotional projects
 Aoyama Christmas Circus (annual Christmas tree lighting event)

IFPI membership
The Group is a member of the IFPI for Hong Kong and Japan.

A-Nation

Each year since 2002, Avex has hosted a summer concert tour around Japan, "A-Nation", featuring the company's most successful acts. It is held every weekend in August in different Japanese cities. Top Avex acts like Ayumi Hamasaki, Kumi Koda, AAA, Ai Otsuka, BIGBANG, BOA ,Do As Infinity, Hitomi, TRF, Every Little Thing and TVXQ perform to major crowds each year. In 2008, Namie Amuro made her first appearance at A-Nation and performed on all dates that year. For the first time in 2012, Kumi Koda did not perform due to her pregnancy.

Festival sponsors include Joe Weider and his Weider fitness products, Seven & I Holdings Co., NTT DoCoMo, Mizuno Corp., Nissay (through its You May Dream! Project), and others.

International partners

 USA – Morgan Rich Corporation/Universal Music Group
 South Korea – S.M. Entertainment, YG Entertainment, KT Music
 Philippines – Universal Records
 Thailand – BEC-TERO Music
 China P.R. – China Record (Shanghai) Corporation

See also
List of artists under the Avex Group
List of record labels
Sony Music Entertainment Japan (one-time shareholder of Avex)
Velfarre

References

External links

Japan
  
 Avex Network

Asia ex. Japan
 Website in Taiwan 
 Website in China 
 Website in Hong Kong 
 Avex Group Asia Portal

Others
 
 

 
Japanese companies established in 1988
Japanese talent agencies
Conglomerate companies based in Tokyo
Companies listed on the Tokyo Stock Exchange
Companies listed on the Frankfurt Stock Exchange
Japanese independent record labels
Record labels established in 1988
Entertainment companies of Japan
Entertainment companies established in 1988
Mass media companies established in 1988
Holding companies established in 1988
Holding companies based in Tokyo
Mass media companies based in Tokyo
IFPI members
Multinational companies headquartered in Japan
Anime companies
1999 initial public offerings